Yuval Dayan born December 28, 1994) is an Israeli singer, songwriter, and composer.

Early and personal life 
Dayan was born and raised in Ashdod, Israel, to a family of Sephardic Jewish (Moroccan-Jewish) descent. Since childhood she has been singing, playing and performing.

In 2013, She was enlisted to the Israel Defense Forces (IDF), and served in the military band of the Education and Youth Corps Entertainment Troupe. 

Since 2016, Dayan has become increasingly religiously observant. Back then she has stated that even before that, she used to attend synagogue every Friday, as well as observes the Shabbat. She resides in Ramat HaSharon, Israel.

Music career
In 2012 she participated in The Voice Israel (Season 1) coached by Shlomi Shabat. She sang the song "She'eriot Shel HaChaim" (Scraps of Life). She advanced to the semi-finals, but unexpectedly announced during the live broadcast that she had decided to bow out of the competition.

In February 2013 her first single from her first album Le'esof (Hebrew: "לאסוף") was released, and succeeded with more than three million views on YouTube. Her second single from the album "Ad Shetachzor" (Hebrew: עד שתחזור)" was released in May 2013. In October 2013 her third single, "Al Tomar", (Hebrew: אל תאמר) written by Dudu Tassa, was released.

The second album Libi Er (Hebrew: ליבי ער) was released in 2016.

Discography
Le'esof (2013)
Libi Er (2016)

References

The Voice Israel
1994 births
People from Ashdod
Israeli people of Moroccan-Jewish descent
21st-century Israeli women singers
Living people
Israeli women singer-songwriters
Israeli Sephardi Jews
Israeli Mizrahi Jews